HMS Rotherham was an R-class destroyer of the British Royal Navy during the Second World War, named after Captain Edward Rotheram, who commanded  during at the Battle of Trafalgar in 1805. Rotherham was completed in 1942 and equipped as a flotilla leader, having slightly reduced armament to allow for the increased complement and working space required.  Decommissioned in 1945, the ship was sold to India in 1948, serving as INS Rajput (D141) until 1976, when she was scrapped.

Royal Navy service

World War II
Rotherham was commissioned for service, after completing her sea trials, in August 1942. After a period of training at Scapa Flow, she was assigned to serve in the South Atlantic, operating as convoy escort between Freetown, Sierra Leone, and Cape Town and Durban, South Africa for the rest of the year.

From February 1944 Rotherham was deployed in the Indian Ocean, and in April joined the Eastern Fleet to take part in series of offensive operations against the Japanese in Sumatra and Java, and the Indian nationalist Azad Hind in the Andaman Islands, acting as an escort to aircraft carriers and battleships. In October 1944 Rotherham sailed to Simon's Town to refit.

In early 1945 Rotherham was deployed intercepting Japanese ships supplying stores and carrying personnel to garrisons in the Andaman and Nicobar Islands, as well as providing support for military operations in Burma. Further anti-shipping and shore bombardments followed, and in April she provided cover for Allied landings near Rangoon during "Operation Dracula". Escort duties continued until the Japanese surrender on 15 August.

Post-war operations
Rotherham was then deployed in "Operation Zipper", the British liberation of Penang, and in early September, as part of "Operation Tiderace", escorted a fleet led by the cruiser  to Singapore to take the surrender of the 77,000 Japanese there. Rotherhams commander personally accepted the surrender of 34,000 personnel of the Imperial Japanese Navy at the Singapore Naval Dockyard at Sembawang, and in commemoration the main entrance was renamed the "Rotherham Gate". The ship remained at Singapore until 27 September 1945, when she sailed to Trincomalee, leaving there on 2 October for Portsmouth, where she was decommissioned and put into the Reserve.

Indian Navy service
Rotherham was sold to India in 1948, and formally transferred to the Indian Navy on 27 July 1949 as INS Rajput (D141). She saw active service during the Indo-Pakistani War of 1971. India maintains that the Rajput was responsible for sinking the Pakistan Navy submarine , though Pakistan contests this, contending that the submarine was sunk by the accidental detonation of one or more of the laid or about-to-be-laid mines the ship was carrying.

Rajput remained an active fleet unit until 1976 when she was placed on the Disposal List and then scrapped.

References

Bibliography
 
 
 
 
 
 
 
 

 

Q and R-class destroyers of the Royal Navy
Ships built on the River Tyne
1942 ships
World War II destroyers of the United Kingdom
R-class destroyers of the Indian Navy